Lycus or Lykos was an ancient river of Cilicia, mentioned only by Pliny (v. 22), that flowed between the Pyramus and Pinarus.

References

Geography of ancient Cilicia
History of Turkey
Former rivers